Acri is a town of 19.949 inhabitants in the northern part of Calabria region in southern Italy. Since 17 September 2001 Acri has had the "status" of city.

Acri's coat of arms is represented by three mountains surmounted by three stars, with the words: "Acrae, Tri Vertex, Montis Fertilis, U.A. (Universitas Acrensis)".
The oldest known heraldic coat of arms of the city of Acri is present on the door of the church and convent of San Domenico, a stone coat of arms made in 1524, together with the coat of arms of the feudal families of the time, the princes San Severino da Bisignano.

The etymology of the word Acri could derive from the Greek ακρα (Akra) which means peak.

Physical geography

Territory 
The urban center is located at 720 mt (2,360 ft), near the Sila. Its territory extension is 200.63 km2 (77.46 sq mi). It dominates the Mucone valley and the Crati valley.

Main rivers: Mucone, Calamo, Duglia.

In the period 2006-2015 it was found to be among the municipalities where more cases of forest fires occurred by hand
of unknowns.

Climate 
The climate is Mediterranean, characterized by harsh winters, during which snowfalls can occur, and summers of dry heat. Although it varies a lot from the city center to the more distant suburbs.

Politics 
 Mayor: 2000 – 2005: Nicola Tenuta.
 Mayor: 2005 – 2010: Elio Coschignano.
 Mayor: 2010 – 2012: Gino Trematerra.
 Mayor: 2012 – 2013: Luigi Maiorano.
 Mayor: 2013 – 2017: Nicola Tenuta.
 Prefectural Commissioner: 2017 – 2017: Maria Vercillo.
 Mayor: 2017 –  : Pino Capalbo.

Monuments and places of interest

Civil architectures

The Castle 

The castle of Acri, also known as Rocca dei Bruzii, was a defensive work, probably erected in the Brutian era, of which only a splendid tower remains today, which is the symbol of the city.

It is located in control of the territory, on the edge of the territory controlled by the powerful Sybaris at the time of Magna Graecia. The hypothesis of bruzia construction now seems fully supported by the various archaeological finds dating from the Eneolithic to the final Bronze Age, found all around the old city of Acri.

Later it was a Roman fortress, as described in a marble plaque in Latin (found in 1890), with the inscription "XII LEGIO", and small portions of mosaics, probably Greek, found near the castle.

The shape of the castle was originally trapezoidal with three towers placed in the highest part, and the fourth placed in the lowest level of the defensive walls to control the drawbridge or the machicolation gate.
The defensive walls surrounded the entire citadel of the Pàdia district.

The surrounding walls of the castle have a diameter of about two meters in the highest part of the perimeter, while the walls of the lower level were described as having a diameter of about four meters.

Visible until the early twentieth century, the cistern for water supply in the event of a siege was located north of the existing tower: it was about two floors high (that is, six meters high) and twenty wide.

In 1999 several coins of Greek origin were found in the walls of the castle, including some from Sybaris, others from Thurii, and only one from Crotone, now in possession of the Archaeological Superintendence of Sibaritide.

Palaces 

 Palazzo Sanseverino-Falcone
Belonging to the powerful Calabrian family of Sanseverino, it was built starting from the 17th century by Giuseppe Leopoldo Sanseverino X prince of Bisignano.
As for the builder of the building, it is certain that it is Stefano Vangeri from Rogliano who worked until 1720, the year in which, in all probability, he also took care of the finishing of the building.
The building stands on four floors, the ground floor and the first floor, housed a sort of guardhouse of the prince. The east wing of the ground floor is characterized by a large hall (Sala delle Colonne). In the center of the room there are eight stone columns, with capitelli of late sixteenth-century style, which some believe reused from a previous building, possibly a church.
The second floor, also known as noble floor, where the family resided, is made up of several halls, where frescoes stood out, which although partially deteriorated are still visible.
The third floor was used for the servants and kitchen.

 Palazzo Padula
Owned by the poet Vincenzo Padula, it was built in an area that was originally isolated and devoid of buildings. On the portal of the palace he had two feathers and an inkwell sculpted, a symbol of the coat of arms of his family.
The palace was equipped with loopholes, suitable for placing firearms, to defend itself from possible attacks by brigands, very frequent in that period.Today the palace gives hospitality to the Municipal Library and the Museum of rural civilization.

 Palazzo Julia 
Datable to the 15th century, it was always the property of the Julia family, who inherited it from father to son. It was built in two different eras: the first period is dated in the sixteenth-sixteenth century and the second at the end of the eighteenth century. The building stands on three floors, and has a very rich library, consisting of over five thousand volumes, with texts from the sixteenth and seventeenth centuries and some rare ancient editions.

 Palazzo De Simone-Julia 
The building bears the name of the family that owned it, the De Simone and his heirs, the Julia. The palace was built in the early seventeenth century and is located in the historic center.

 Palazzo Spezzano 
Ancient noble residence of the eighteenth century, palace of the Spezzano noble family.

 Palazzo Astorino Giannone 
Originally the palace was inhabited by the Astorino family, in 1700, and later by the Fusari family. The Giannone family, coming from Bitonto in province of Bari, largely transformed the building, as an ancient country mansion. Inside there are still furniture and paintings from the eighteenth and nineteenth centuries, and a library made up of thousands of ancient volumes from the eighteenth and nineteenth centuries.

 Palazzo Civitate 
This ancient palace belonged until 1800 to an ancient and noble family, the Civitate originally from San Marco Argentano, which moved to Acri in 1400. The building stands on three floors, plus the cellars located on the south side: nothing remains of its original splendor, following the transformations carried out by the various owners that followed one another. The only part that has remained unchanged and is truly interesting is the entrance door with the coat of arms of the Civitate family, which remains as it was in antiquity and three iron cages called caggiarole in the local dialect. These are ancient cages placed on the wall in front of the Azzinnari square, by the Napoleonic army, where the heads of three famous bandit leaders were placed, guilty, according to the accusation, of the kidnapping and killing of the three sons of the Civitate family, between 1720 and 1730.

Religious architecture 
 Church of the Madonna del Rinfresco, built by the parish priest Giacomo De Piris in 1521.
 Church and convent of San Francesco di Paola. Dated between the 16th and 17th centuries.
 Basilica of Sant'Angelo.
 Church of Santa Chiara built in 1420.
 Church of the Annunziata, whose first historical mention is 1269, in the ancient church now transformed into a sacristy, a Byzantine-Gothic style fresco was recently discovered depicting the deposition of Jesus Christ on Golgotha by an unknown artist, at the bottom words in ancient Gothic .
 Church and convent of the Capuchin Fathers of 1590.
 Church of San Nicola Ante Castillum (San Nicola of Mjra) Rebuilt in the early 15th century, probably built around 10th-11th century. In the consolidation works, part of the old original structure of a previous church was discovered, dating back to around the 8th century. In the audience of Bishop Ruffino, mention is made of the reopening to worship after the terrible earthquake of 1080–1081, and the consecration of five Greek rite priests.
 Church of Santa Maria Maggiore, 1269. During the works in 2004 and subsequently in those of 2007, numerous discoveries were made on the building, which date the church with certainty to the early Christian period.
 Church of Santa Caterina probably built around 1500. Partly destroyed by the earthquake of 1638.
 Church of San Nicola da Belvedere of ancient Greek rite, located in the ancient Casalicchio district. It is present in the audience of Bishop Ruffino da Bisignano, with a description of its reopening for worship, after the terrible earthquake of 1080, of this church for the first time in 1070 on the occasion of the gift that the Queen Giovanna d'Angiò gave to Count Simone Cofone of Acri and Padia.

Economy 

 

The Acre Pig Reproduction Experimental Center (ARSA) focuses its activity on the breeding of black pigs and support for activities ranging from production to processing, such as the experimental activity relating to the typification of Calabrian delicatessen. The related activities are: recovery, enhancement, breeding and dissemination of local pig farming, with particular attention to the Calabrian black pig. Pig production is important and feeds the locally renowned charcuterie industry.

There are artisanal businesses, small industrial companies in the area.

It also produces and exports wine, oil and livestock.

Infrastructure and transport 
The main connection road is SP660 which connects Acri with the motorway A2 ( Reggio – Salerno )and the Sila National Park, another important road is the SP177 which connects Acri with the road SS106 ( Reggio  – Taranto ) and the Corigliano-Rossano City. Road accident risk: the danger is high along the SP 660.

Sports

Sports facilities 
"Pasquale Castrovillari" Municipal Stadium with a capacity of 5000 seats.

Football 
The main team of the city is Calcio Acri which plays in the Calabria Promotion championship.

In addition there is also the 5-a-side football team called Calcio a 5 Acri which plays in the provincial championship of the CSI

Rugby 
Also present is the rugby team, "Rugby Acri" which in recent years has achieved important successes on the regional scene.

History 

The origins of the city of Acri have long been debated among scholars, and in general attributed to the ancient people of the Osci, later supplanted by the Bruzi and Lucani.

The prehistoric settlements 

The discovery of the archaeological site of Colle Logna in Acri, by prof. Giuseppe Palermo, took place in 1996. The excavations in Colle Logna archaeological site started in 1998 by the Archaeological Superintendence of Calabria, Sibari Excavation Office, in agreement with the European Protohistory Department of the Università "La Sapienza" di Roma. A human settlement was discovered on the western slopes of Colle Logna. The most ancient artifacts found were dated to the beginning of the middle Neolithic (6350 +/-50 BC) while the most recent are recognizable as manifestations of the ancient Bronze Age (2800-2100 BC).
In 2002, a second site was identified in the locality of Policaretto (in the municipality of Acri). The two settlements are placed opposite each other. Identical materials have been found but in the second in greater quantities, and perhaps, according to experts, even older. The extension of the second settlement must have been considerable, including several hill peaks.

In July 2002 a third excavation campaign started in the Policaretto locality.

Among the findings on the site we note the discovery of ovens for the processing of ceramics, Bruzia pottery and the remains of a Roman villa, dated to the 2nd-1st century BC.Other findings in the area include obsidian and flint arrowheads, fragments of local pottery, Osca or Bruzia, remains of archaic Greek pottery, small bronze objects, and various Greek coins, now in custody at the National Archaeological Museum of Sibaritide .

So, in summary,between the Eneolithic and the Late Bronze Age, a human settlement was present in the territory of Acri.

Pandosia 

" Pandosia Bruzia " is an ancient city mentioned by ancient historians and probably located in the territory of Acri.

Pandosia is described by the historian Strabo (VI 1, -5) as the ancient capital of the people of Enotri, therefore it must have been an important center between the Bronze Age and the Iron Age, in a more recent age it is remembered because the King of Epirus Alexander the Molosser was murdered near the river Acheron, which flowed in its vicinity.

In the historic center as well as in Acri's surroundings, considerable archaeological finds analyzed with carbon 14 have highlighted the constant presence of the area starting from the Pre-Eneolithic up to the Iron Age, furthermore subsequent discoveries show the frequentation up to the Classical Age.

Acri in Roman times 
Acri opposed the dominion of Rome but, after the battle of Canne, sided with Carthaginians and then had to surrender in 203 BC.

His desire for freedom was revived between 73 and 71 BC. when, together with the neighboring municipalities, supported the revolt of Spartacus, encamped in the territories called Campo Vile near the municipality of Bisignano, during the third servile war .

Procopius tells us that the Acri's fortress later passed to the Emperor Justinian. In 542 we have news of the strenuous resistance that the city of Acri opposed to the Ostrogoths, led by Totila, who conquered the city, using hunger and thirst, sacked it, destroying much of it, and perpetrating horrible violences.

Acri in medieval and modern times 

In the first half of 650 and at the end of 670, to escape an intense epidemic of malaria, the inhabitants still remaining in nearby Thurii moved to Acri. The demographic increase involved a clear improvement of productive activities: it was a period of general well-being.

From the Longobards to the Normans 

With the arrival of the Longobards in the Crati valley, Acri immediately became their Gastaldato, of considerable economic importance, this at least until 896, when it was occupied by Byzantines first and then by Saracens.

Once freed, three other Saracen raids are documented in 945, 1009 and 1200.

In the first period of the arrival of the Normans, led by Roberto il Guiscardo Acri and the city of Bisignano, the two stronger cities in the Crati valley were repeatedly attacked and sacked; at the end of the war, Guiscardo, to maintain and consolidate power, bestowed wide privileges on the nobles.

And in the year 1074-1075 he granted to count Simone Cofone (count of Acri and of Pàdia) large portions of the Sila territory, at the time partly ancient possession of the Cistercian monks of the monastery called dei Menna, and partly of Count Cofone.

Between 1084 and 1086 A.D. the conflict of interest resulted in a bloody war. The truce, which provided for the count of Acri to retain possession of the lands, but with the obligation to pay tribute to the monks, turned out to be a chimera. Other disputes followed one another and the convent was attacked and also the neighboring ones, and it continued in such a bloody way, that the Pope Urban II excommunicated all the participants, and the Norman magistracy sentenced them to five years in prison and the payment of five thousand pounds of gold and silver to the adversaries of the monks, who got the lands back.

Meanwhile, in that period the slow but progressive work of Latinization wanted by the Normans continued, but in an environment strongly linked to the Byzantine cult, in fact it should be remembered that San Nilo da Rossano between 982 and 987 founded the monastery of Saints Hadrian, Natalia and Demetrius in the territory of Acri, the most consistent center of the Basilians in Calabria. Near the monastery arose the Picitti, Schifo and Poggio districts, later absorbed over time by the Albanian village of San Demetrio Corone.

The monastic order of the Cistercians played an important role in the spiritual life of the time in the territory of Acri, they built the monastery known as the  SS. Trinity de Lignos Crucis . This monastery was built between 1153 and 1195 and housed the Abbot Gioacchino da Fiore probably destroyed during the last incursion of the Saracens into the territory around 1220–1240. The monastery was important for the development of the culture of silkworm and in various other craft activities, such as the leather tannery and factories.

The earthquake of 1185 
In the  History of Bisignano , it describes the earthquake which occurred in the ancient diocese of Bisignano, and mentions that under the government of Guglielmo II between 1184 and 1186 the Calabria was shaken by terrible earthquakes and various centers of the presila were damaged or completely destroyed, and that in 1185 Acri was almost completely destroyed by the earthquake. To this was added the devastation caused by hunger and cholera following a long drought, which aggravated the situation of the survivors. Only after several months of work, mainly due to landslides, was it possible to open a communication route to be able to bring wagons and reach the most isolated areas of the territory. Other documented earthquakes were those of 908; 10 December 968; 990; 24 May 1184; 24 October 1186; 27 March 1638; 1712; 1738; 14 July 1767; 5 February 1783; 1787; 10 December 1824; 8 March 1832; 12 October 1835; 24 April 1836.

The cholera and plague epidemics 
In addition to cholera between 1184 and 1186, it is known for sure that Calabria, and especially Cosenza, was prey to various epidemics that halved the population then existing. Documented is the plague of 1348, the successive ones of 1422, 1528, 1575, 1656, 1638, 1738 and lastly the Spanish, which occurred in the early century, which according to the census cost the lives of about a thousand citizens.

Acri in 1300 
In 1300 the number of state-owned cities, that is, not fiefdoms to private families and remained in possession of the crown, was not small.

The Sangineto and the Sanseverino demanded the restitution of the territories acquired by the Diocese of Bisignano, according to them usurped by the bishops and abbots.

Between these lands and these fiefdoms there was Acri, under the jurisdiction of the Bishop of Bisignano, who was forbidden to consider them fiefs of the Church, since for the precedents arranged by Charles I of Anjou, the aforementioned territories and the relative castles fell within the sphere of competence and pertinence of the barons.
The bishop's stubborn refusal not to give up the lands and not wanting to renounce the alleged feudal rights, unleashed the powerful baron's revenge.

The riots, reprisals and violent and bloody clashes between the various suitors were continuous, the most significant and dramatic occurred in 1339.

The Baron Ruggero II Sangineto, taking advantage of the confusion that reigned in Bisignano at the time, was able to complete his design: from Corigliano a group of armed on horseback, he reached Acri, and dragging hungry and needy common people with him, eager for looting and booty, they headed for Bisignano.

On 28 June 1339, the eve of the feast of St. Peter and Paul, they entered the city of Bisignano and killed both the Bishop's personal guards and family members, and all those who defended him.

Finally, the dying bishop was mercilessly dragged and tied to the tail of the Sangineto horse.

With other convicts he was taken to a place, called  Scannaturu , probably located behind the current church of San Domenico.

The unfortunate bishop by now lifeless was condemned to be beheaded, immediately carried out, as for all the other condemned who suffered the same fate.

Frederick II, the Angevins and the Aragonese 
During the reign of Frederick II the city enjoyed a period of relative tranquility and considerable economic prosperity, it became an important center in the silk trade, until the arrival of the Angevins and then of the Aragonese, who considerably weakened the city's economy with their heavy taxes.

In 1462 the Duke of San Marco Argentano, Luca Sanseverino, bought the city of Acri and Bisignano from the tax authorities, by concession of the king Ferrante I d'Aragona, for the sum of 20,000 gold and silver ducats.

In the same year the city of Acri, which remained loyal to the Angevins, underwent a terrible siege by the Aragonese troops, who, failing to conquer the city, through the collaboration of a traitor, a certain Milan, indicated to the enemy troops the signals of the guards of the outposts, and who at the appointed time in the middle of the night opened the gates of the city.

The heroic commander of the city guards, Nicolò Clancioffo, in the square of the castle, was sawed alive by the loins, and his body divided into four pieces and exhibited on the four towers of the castle.

From a document of the notary Marsilio Aliprandi of 1479–80, it is stated that many properties in the Parrieti, Padia, Picitti and Castello districts were sold as vegetable gardens, because the houses were burned, now in ruins, and there were not enough men to rebuild the said neighborhoods.

We do not have complete news of 1462, but it is assumed that in that war the city lost about two thousand inhabitants, including part of the armies that followed the viceroy Grimaldi, who, together with a few of his own, was able to escape from the dungeons of the Castle di Acri, and then take refuge in the nearby Longobucco.

Acri from 1492 to 1499 
From 1492 Acri passed under the Aragonese governorate. On the descent of Charles VIII, the prince of Bisignano set off to meet the king, while the count of Acri and the marquis of Squillace, fled and refugees in Sicily. Their possessions were confiscated by King Charles, then donated to a certain D'Aubugny loyal to the Angevins, allies of Charles VIII, but when they knew that all the lands had been donated to D'Aubugny, they supported again the Aragonese. The city of Acri sided with the king Frederick of Aragon, loyalty which cost to Acri year another siege (1496-1497) with modern siege weapons, the sacking of the city by the Angevins, the almost complete destruction of the castle, of some important noble palaces and the chiefs of the people, the nobles Placido and Sebastiano of the powerful Salvidio family, were killed and torn to pieces and their bodies thrown into manure.

The expulsion of the Jews 

In 1511 by decree of king Ferdinand I the Jews, important figures in the economy of the city, inhabitants of the ancient ghetto of the Judeica. The local economy deteriorated considerably. The place where the ghetto was still today is called Judeica, located near the torrente Calamo, outside the fortified walls; the presence of the ghetto in Acri is documented before the year one thousand.

Brigandage in Acri

The Raid of the Jaccapitta Gang 

In 1806, Acri had to undergo the incursion of a horde of brigands who, intending to go to nearby Bisignano, stopped in the city.

It was a strong group of 3,000 men who, following Jacapitta, had descended with the intention of destroying the city of Bisignano, coming mostly from the Cosenza woods and the hamlets around Cosenza.

Plundered Acri, and committed themselves to terrible acts of cruelty, they headed for their destination.

But when they reached Bisignano they found the forces of Bagnanich and those of Benincasa, supported by the entire population.

Thus they withdrew towards the mountains of Acri.

On 30 August General Verdier left with a detachment of 1,500 men, joined by the Bisignano garrison.

The brigand Jaccapitta hid in the surrounding countryside and was found.

In Acri, in chains, Jacapitta entered, the ferocious brutal and bloodthirsty brigand who had cruelly attacked the tortured bodies of the victims of Acri, even staining himself with heinous acts of cannibalism.

Bound and dragged into the square, he was placed in the middle of four fires. The Jaccapitta, cursing and cursing, jumped from one stake to the other, trying to escape the torture, while the bystanders hit him in the legs with crackles. Exhausted, at last, with a savage cry he collapsed into the flames that reduced him to ashes.

The Band of King Coremme 

In August of the same year, coming down from the mountains of Acri, the brigand chief Antonio Santoro, known as  Re Coremme , tried to take Bisignano.
He was an illiterate peasant, but shrewd and extremely brave.
Once the Bourbon resistance in Calabria ceased, he had organized a formidable band with which he intended to continue, in his own way, the war against the French.
Assaulted Acri during the night, and, having bent the administrators to his will, he moved from this new base to sow death and terror to defeat his enemies "the anti-Bourbon revolutionaries", supporters of the French.
In his attempt he was taken by surprise by the troops of General Verdier who managed to disperse the band.
Santoro, now in a hasty flight, having lost all contact with the bulk of his men, came across the civic squad of Santa Sofia d'Epiro commanded by Giorgio Ferriolo.
It was 13 August 1806 and Santoro was captured together with his small staff, made up of his brother and some trusted men. Locked up in an isolated cell, the Santoro managed to escape, reaching Acri at night.

Acri from the Unification of Italy to 1950 

The history of Acri starting from the administration of Vincenzo Sprovieri, who, at the beginning, had raised great hopes in the people of Acri.
These expectations were soon disappointed, as Sprovieri renounced the promises made in 1848 by establishing a despotic power. Sprovieri, if on the one hand he managed to eradicate the phenomenon of brigandage, on the other he used the immense state property owned by the municipality, to win the benevolence of councilors, councilors and voters, leaving the so-called  "acritan plebs" .

Subsequent administrations made no changes to Sprovieri's line, continuing to plunder the state property, regardless of the complaints made by the local newspapers of the time, to the competent authorities, actually conniving.

At the beginning of the twentieth century, the situation of the town had little changed compared to the Risorgimento period. In recent years, the first and only electricity company was born in Acri, which will then supply public and private electricity, but which brought few benefits to the majority of the population, but many useful to its operators. Also in these years, social assistance was born with the creation of a hospital, a hospice for the poor and a boarding school thanks to the activity of Francesco Maria Greco to whom he also goes the merit of having moralized the clergy of Acri.

During World War I, 1,518 Acresi left for the front. The postwar period was characterized in Acri by the outbreak of cholera, by massive social demonstrations due to the high cost of living and the lack of work.

In 1927, with the unfortunate advent of fascism, the administration podestarile of Paride Manes begins, followed by those of Filippo Sprovieri, Angelo Giannone and by Pasquale Talarico which ended in 1943.

On the work of the Podestà administrations, the words written by the Podestà Talarico to the Prefect of Cosenza apply that  "in Acri there was, in the 40s, a sad administrative situation, a no less sad moral situation of the population who still lived under a regime feudal without the fascist civilization having even appeared to lighten the minds and soften the hearts of most of the citizens ".

At the outbreak of World War II, 1,352 Acri citizens left for the front.

With the fall of fascism, the municipal administration was governed by the prefectural commissioners who were unable to respond to the lack of food and the scarcity of work.

A turning point took place, with the election as mayor of Saverio Spezzano, in 1946, who kept faith with the commitments made during the electoral campaign, ensuring the people of Acri bread, work but also "balls and mesh", that is rigor and legality.

A difficult year for Acri was 1948, due to a strong political conflict, for the occupation of the lands, in particular the Pietramorella wood.

Population

Traits 
The highest population density is in the main town: Acri. The old age index instead indicates a concentration of the same in rural areas, as well as for the incidence of elderly couples. The incidence of highly-medium-specialized professions and education level is higher in the main urban center.

Ethnicities and foreign minorities 
According to ISTAT as of 31 December 2018, the foreign resident population was 721 people. Top ten nationalities:
  312
  107
  104
  27 
  24
  18
  13
  11
  8
  8 
  8

Others: Afghanistan, Iraq 7, Tunisia 5, Russia Federation, Latvia, Bangladesh 4, Egypt, Nigeria, Senegal, Burkina Faso 3, Austria, France, Liberia, Spain, Hungary, Ghana, Morocco, Nigeria, Venezuela, Gambia 2, Denmark , Netherlands, Switzerland, Pakistan, Guinea, Algeria, Angola, Sudan, Cuba, Dominican Republic, Honduras, Mexico, Brazil, Colombia, Philippines Argentina, Moldova, Ivory Coast.

Culture 

Most people in the town of Acri are part of the Christian religion, and, as a result, follow Christian customs along with traditional Italian ones. They also celebrate nights such as White Night, Pink Night, and Red Night, which is shopping & economy correlated activities each with their own customs. For example, on White Night, shops & restaurants are open throughout the night and performers are often arranged to perform.

Languages and dialects 
The dialect of Acri is a Romance language, it derives from the spoken Latin, even if it retains traces of stratifications of the languages of the dominations that followed.
Among the main characteristics of the Acri's dialect, compared to Italian:
-Added "EA" in the endings of words and verbs (e.g. accattatu in calabrian becomes accatteatu in acrese)
- the transformation of the vowels "O" and "E" of Italian respectively into the vowels "U" and "I" (peres., vinu = wine; pani = bread);
- the transformation of the letter "B" of the Italian into "V" (vasciu = bass); however when the "B" is preceded by the "M" it assumes its sound (progressive assimilation: gamma = leg);
- singular characteristic of the Acri's dialect is that of changing the consonant "L" followed by a vowel into "D"; e.g. in Calabrian "mela" becomes "mida", in the acrese dialect: "midu"; "luci" (light) becomes "duci".

In general, Acri follows the Calabrian dialect that is common in Calabria & Southern Italy.

Museums and Libraries 
Municipal Library in the Padula Palace.

MACA Acri Contemporary Art Museum in the Palazzo Sanseverino-Falcone .

Museum of the Beato Angelo in the premises of the convent of the Capuchin Fathers.

Museum of rural civilization in the Padula Palace.

Media

Television 
EATV founded on 1 December 2016, Channel 623 of digital terrestrial.

Radio 
Radio Acheruntia, founded in 1977.

Demographic evolution 

Demographic trend

People 

 Giovanni Battista Falcone, an Italian patriot, protagonist of the Sapri Expedition
 Vincenzo Padula, poet
 Luca Antonio Falcone, better known as Saint Angelo of Acri, who is a popular figure in the town
 Charles Atlas, bodybuilder and trainer
 Francesco Maria Greco, priest 
 Silvio Vigliaturo, glass artist and painter
 Marcello Guido, deconstructivist architect
 Angelo Arciglione, pianist

References 

Cities and towns in Calabria